is a shōjo manga series created by Michiyo Akaishi. The story was adapted into an anime by Tatsunoko Productions in 1985, with character designs by Akemi Takada.

Summary 

Lundi is a young boy who lives with his aunt and uncle in Switzerland in the early 1930s. One day while walking around the Alps, Lundi finds a little girl who is the only survivor of a plane crash and has lost all her memories. She is named Jeudi by his uncle and both of them are raised together. As they grow up together, Jeudi and Lundi develop a deep friendship for each other...

A few years later Jeudi wants to find her past. Her only clue is a song that she is constantly hearing in her head, a song called Alpen Rose. At the time of World War II, Jeudi and Lundi set on a journey to discover Jeudi's past and in the process learn the depth of the love they have for each other.

Characters
Lundi Cortot is a Swiss young man who lives not too far from the Alps with his aunt and uncle. As a little kid, he found a girl around his age with her pet cockatoo lying in a field of flowers, and convinced his aunt and uncle to take her in. After an incident with Count George Germont, in which he and Printemps are almost shot by him, Jeudi is taken to the Count's castle by force. He helps her escape and they must flee their village. This also gives them the chance to both get hitched and start investigating Jeudi's strange past.
Jeudi was found amnesiac and unconscious by Lundi, who gave her the name "Jeudi". She was subsequently taken in by a shopkeeper in the manga or nursing school in the anime. At age 13, Jeudi catches the eye of Count Germont when she protect Lundi and Printemps, and he takes her by force to his castle to make her his concubine. Lundi comes to her rescue and they flee to the town of Bern after they begin to have leads about her true identity. Eventually they learn her real name is Alicia Brendel.
Printemps is Jeudi's pet cockatoo, who has been with her ever since before the fateful accident that brought her to Lundi's life.
Leonhard Aschenbach is a young pianist.
Count George Germont is an arrogant aristocrat who is in pursuit of Jeudi, and is revealed to have gained influence within the Nazis. His ambition is to rule the world.
Countess Francoise is Count Germont's wife who dislikes what he has become. She eventually decides to end it by shooting him and burning his house, and committing suicide.
Friedrich Brendel is Jeudi/Alicia's father.
Helene Dunant is Jeudi/Alicia's mother.
Jacques Dunant is Jeudi/Alicia's grandfather, a relative of Henry Dunant.
Matilda Tronchant a girl posing as Helene's daughter, Alicia.
Michel Tronchant is Matilda's father who is considered to be Basil Zaharoff's successor as an arms dealer. He supported the Dunant family and sent his daughter Matilda to pose as Helene's daughter, Alicia, to gain control of the Dunants due to their involvement in founding the Red Cross.
Hans is a boy who died helping Lundi and Jeudi to get away from Count Germont.
Clara is Hans's little sister.
Martha is a girl who was friends with Hans.
Jean-Jacques Cortot is an assassin with the nickname "Tarantula". It's later revealed that he is Lundi's brother.
Duboir is a man who works under Count Germont.
Henri Guisan

Manga 

The manga series was originally serialized in Japan, in 1983, in the weekly magazine Ciao by Shogakukan, with the first volume of the series being released in October 1983. The second, third, and fourth followed in February 1984, July 1984, and November 1984. And from then on chapters of the story were released periodically over the next three years with volumes of the manga series being released in a 3- to 6-month period. The series was finished in late 1986, finishing the storyline in nine small volumes of approximately 180 pages. The remaining volumes (5, 6, 7 8, and 9) were released in February 1985, July 1985, December 1985, June 1986, and September 1986.

The manga series was reissued 1993 by Shogakukan through the publishing branch Flower Comics Wide Magazine. This new version was released in four large volumes of at least approximately 350 pages. This new version included new covers, colored pages in each volume as well was pin-ups at the end of the volumes. More recently the series was reissued in Japan in 2009 in four volumes by Flower Comics DeLuxe with different covers which were a combination of black-and-white photos of different parts of Paris, France with picture of the main characters of the series in the center.

Episodes 
 Prologue To The Torrent of Love (April 6, 1985)
 Angel in the Light
 A Whistle Beyond Death
 Seconds Until Trap
 The Past Hidden in the Garden
 The Melody of Red Roses
 Resound! To the Skies of our Homeland
 The Beautiful Fugitives
 Lundi's Knight Sword
 Memories and the Morning Goodbye
 Ruined Ambition
 There's Two Alicia!?
 The Song of Love
 Farewell to Peace
 The Lonely Piano
 The Assassin of Paris
 The Escaping Hans
 Love Song Among the Fog
 The Gun Pointed at Freedom
 The Wings of a Dream

Prop designers 
 Studio " Ammonite " (Hiroshi Ogawa , Hiroshi Okura , and Takashi Ono.)

References

External links

1983 manga
1985 anime television series debuts
Drama anime and manga
Historical anime and manga
Romance anime and manga
Shōjo manga
Shogakukan franchises
Shogakukan manga
Fuji TV original programming
Tatsunoko Production
Comics set in Switzerland
Comics set in the 1930s